John Adrian Simpson (August 20, 1854 – September 11, 1916) was a Canadian politician and businessman. Born in Peel County, Ontario, he came west in 1890 and eventually settled in Innisfail, where he opened a lumberyard.  He served on Innisfail's first town council, and also in the legislative assemblies of the Northwest Territories and later Alberta; in the last, he acted as deputy speaker.

Early life
John Simpson was born in 1854 in Peel County, Ontario.  He married Anna Proudfoot in 1879, before coming west to Calgary in 1890.  Shortly after, he moved to the Olds area, and in 1891 he settled in Innisfail where he started a lumberyard the next year.

Political career
Besides being a member of Innisfail's first town council, Simpson sought election to the Legislative Assembly of the Northwest Territories in the 1894 election in the district of Red Deer.  He defeated two candidates, including incumbent Francis Wilkins, and was subsequently re-elected in the 1898 and 1902 elections, on the latter occasion in the new district of Innisfail.  He continued to serve in the legislature until his riding became part of the new province of Alberta in 1905.

Simpson ran in Alberta's first provincial election in Innisfail as the Liberal candidate, and was elected over Conservative Sam Curry by a single vote—the narrowest margin of any race in the election.  In the Legislative Assembly of Alberta, Simpson served as deputy speaker.  During the Alberta and Great Waterways Railway scandal, he remained loyal to the government of Premier Alexander Cameron Rutherford in the face of a rebellion from Liberal insurgents.  There was some concern on the government side that the speaker, Charles W. Fisher, would resign to support the insurgents; Simpson's elevation to speaker, a position which was expected to remain impartial, would rob the government of a crucial vote.  After Rutherford's government fell, Simpson supported the successor government of Liberal Arthur Sifton, though its stance on the issue that had toppled Rutherford's government—the construction of the Alberta and Great Waterways Railway—was in many respects diametrically opposed to Rutherford's.

Though he was re-elected in the 1909 election, in 1913 Simpson was defeated by Conservative Fred W. Archer.  He did not re-enter political life. He died suddenly at his Innisfail home on September 11, 1916 and was buried at the Innisfail Cemetery.

Electoral record

References

Notes

External links 

1854 births
1916 deaths
Alberta Liberal Party MLAs
Alberta municipal councillors
Canadian businesspeople
Members of the Legislative Assembly of the Northwest Territories
People from the Regional Municipality of Peel
People from Red Deer County